Joseph Banks Secondary College (abbreviated as JBSC) is an independent public co-educational  high day school, located in Banksia Grove, a suburb  north of Perth, Western Australia.

Overview

The new school was first announced in March 2012. Construction started on the first stage of the school in June 2012. That stage cost $48.7 million, and had a capacity of 850 students. This stage opened for the start of the 2015 school year to 226 Year 7 students and 192 Year 8 students.

The school's namesake is Joseph Banks, an English botanist who was on James Cook's first great voyage which visited the east coast of Australia. He catalogued several plants, including the genus Banksia, which is the namesake of Banksia Grove. In keeping with the theme of botany, the school's houses are named after local plants, and the logo is a representation of a Banksia flower. The houses are Ornata, Formosa, Incana and Serrata.

The $22.5 million second stage of construction opened mid-2017, expanding the capacity of the school to 1,450 students. By 2020 though, the school had a student population of 1,513, requiring five transportable classrooms.

In 2020, as part of the state's COVID-19 recovery plan, construction of a new $16.1 million building was announced. The new building is planned to include a "Space Science Education Centre". The school's foundation principal stated that "it had been a long-term goal to establish the school as a specialist science and mathematics school".

Local intake area
Joseph Banks Secondary College's local intake area covers Banksia Grove, parts of Carabooda, Carramar, Mariginiup, Neerabup, Nowergup, Pinjar and Tapping. Students living in the local intake area have a guaranteed place at the school if they apply. Students living outside the local intake area may apply and they will be accepted on a case-by-case basis.

Academic results
2019 was the first year where Year 12s graduated Joseph Banks Secondary College.

Student numbers

See also

 List of schools in the Perth metropolitan area

References

Public high schools in Perth, Western Australia
Educational institutions established in 2015
2015 establishments in Australia